¿Quién quiere ser millonario? is the title of several Who Wants to Be a Millionaire? franchise game shows in Spanish-speaking countries.

 ¿Quién quiere ser millonario? (Argentine game show)
 ¿Quién quiere ser millonario? (Chilean game show)
 ¿Quién quiere ser millonario? (Colombian game show)
 ¿Quién quiere ser millonario? (Costa Rican game show)
 ¿Quién quiere ser millonario? (Ecuadorian game show)
 ¿Quién quiere ser millonario? (Salvadoran game show)
 ¿Quién quiere ser millonario? (Mexican game show)
 ¿Quién quiere ser millonario? (Peruvian game show)
 ¿Quién quiere ser millonario? (Panamanian game show)
 ¿Quién quiere ser millonario? (Spanish game show)
 ¿Quién quiere ser millonario? (Uruguayan game show)
 ¿Quién quiere ser millonario? (Venezuelan game show)